In electronics, metastability is the ability of a digital electronic system to persist for an unbounded time in an unstable equilibrium or metastable state.
In digital logic circuits, a digital signal is required to be within certain voltage or current limits to represent a '0' or '1' logic level for correct circuit operation; if the signal is within a forbidden intermediate range it may cause faulty behavior in logic gates the signal is applied to.  In metastable states, the circuit may be unable to settle into a stable '0' or '1' logic level within the time required for proper circuit operation.  As a result, the circuit can act in unpredictable ways, and may lead to a system failure, sometimes referred to as a "glitch". Metastability is an instance of the Buridan's ass paradox.

Metastable states are inherent features of asynchronous digital systems, and of systems with more than one independent clock domain.  In self-timed asynchronous systems, arbiters are designed to allow the system to proceed only after the metastability has resolved, so the metastability is a normal condition, not an error condition.
In synchronous systems with asynchronous inputs, synchronizers are designed to make the probability of a synchronization failure acceptably small. 
Metastable states are avoidable in fully synchronous systems when the input setup and hold time requirements on flip-flops are satisfied.

Example

A simple example of metastability can be found in an SR NOR latch, when  Set and Reset inputs are true (R=1 and S=1) and then both transition to false (R=0 and S=0) at about the same time. After both Set and Reset inputs change to false, the flip-flop will (eventually) end up in one of two stable states, one of Q and  true and the other false. The final state will depend on which of R or S returns to zero first, chronologically, but if both transition at about the same time, the resulting metastability, with intermediate or oscillatory output levels, can take arbitrarily long to resolve to a stable state.

Arbiters 

In electronics, an arbiter is a circuit designed to determine which of several signals arrive first. Arbiters are used in asynchronous circuits to order computational activities for shared resources to prevent concurrent incorrect operations. Arbiters are used on the inputs of fully synchronous systems, and also between clock domains, as synchronizers for input signals.  Although they can minimize the occurrence of metastability to very low probabilities,  all arbiters nevertheless have metastable states, which are unavoidable at the boundaries of regions of the input state space resulting in different outputs.

Synchronous circuits

Synchronous circuit design techniques make digital circuits that are resistant to the failure modes that can be caused by metastability. A clock domain is defined as a group of flip-flops with a common clock.  Such architectures can form a circuit guaranteed free of metastability (below a certain maximum clock frequency, above which first metastability, then outright failure occur), assuming a low-skew common clock. However, even then, if the system has a dependence on any continuous inputs then these are likely to be vulnerable to metastable states.

When synchronous design techniques are used, protection against metastable events causing systems failures need only be provided when transferring data between different clock domains or from an unclocked circuitry into a clocked one (synchronous). This protection can often take the form of a series of delay flip-flops which delay the data stream long enough for metastability failures to occur at a negligible rate.

Failure modes
Although metastability is well understood and architectural techniques to control it are known, it persists as a failure mode in equipment.

Serious computer and digital hardware bugs caused by metastability have a fascinating social history. Many engineers have refused to believe that a bistable device can enter into a state that is neither true nor false and has a positive probability that it will remain indefinite for any given period of time, albeit with exponentially decreasing probability over time.  However, metastability is an inevitable result of any attempt to map a continuous domain to a discrete one.  At the boundaries in the continuous domain between regions which map to different discrete outputs,  points arbitrarily close together in the continuous domain map to different outputs, making a decision as to which output to select a difficult and potentially lengthy process.  If the inputs to an arbiter or flip-flop arrive almost simultaneously, the circuit most likely will traverse a point of metastability. Metastability remains poorly understood in some circles, and various engineers have proposed their own circuits said to solve or filter out the metastability; typically these circuits simply shift the occurrence of metastability from one place to another.  Chips using multiple clock sources are often tested with tester clocks that have fixed phase relationships, not the independent clocks drifting past each other that will be experienced during operation.  This usually explicitly prevents the metastable failure mode that will occur in the field from being seen or reported. Proper testing for metastability frequently employs clocks of slightly different frequencies and ensuring correct circuit operation.

See also
 Analog-to-digital converter
 Buridan's ass
 Asynchronous CPU
 Ground bounce
 Tri-state logic

References

External links
 Metastability Performance of Clocked FIFOs
 The 'Asynchronous' Bibliography
 Asynchronous Logic
 Efficient Self-Timed Interfaces for Crossing Clock Domains 
 Dr. Howard Johnson: Deliberately inducing the metastable state
  Detailed explanations and Synchronizer designs
 Metastability Bibliography
 Clock Domain Crossing: Closing the Loop on Clock Domain Functional Implementation Problems, Cadence Design Systems
 Stephenson, Jennifer. Understanding Metastability in FPGAs. Altera Corporation white paper. July 2009.
 Bahukhandi, Ashirwad. Metastability. Lecture Notes for Advanced Logic Design and Switching Theory. January 2002.
 Cummings, Clifford E. Synthesis and Scripting Techniques for Designing Multi-Asynchronous Clock Designs. SNUG 2001.
 Haseloff, Eilhard. Metastable Response in 5-V Logic Circuits. Texas Instruments Report. February 1997.
 Nystrom, Mika, and Alain J. Martin. Crossing the Synchronous Asynchronous Divide. WCED 2002.
Patil, Girish, IFV Division, Cadence Design Systems. Clock Synchronization Issues and Static Verification Techniques. Cadence Technical Conference 2004.
 Smith, Michael John Sebastian. Application-Specific Integrated Circuits. Addison Wesley Longman, 1997, Chapter 6.4.1.
 Stein, Mike. Crossing the abyss: asynchronous signals in a synchronous world EDN design feature. July 24, 2003.
 Cox, Jerome R. and Engel, George L., Blendics, Inc. White Paper  "Metastability and Fatal System Errors"] Nov. 2010
 Adam Taylor, "Wrapping One's Brain Around Metastability", EE Times, 2013-11-20

Electrical engineering
Digital electronics